An Episcopium (Latin for an episcopal palace) is an ecclesiastical figure and their administration. Episcopium emphasizes “an essential unity between his [the bishop’s] person, power and place.” In medieval Italy episcopia were frequently part of a complex connected to the Baptistery and Cathedral.

In Rome the Basilica of St. John Lateran housed the Lateran Palace. This was the principal Episcopium of medieval Rome. Although Pope John VII (705-07) built an Episcopium upon the Palatine Hill.

References

 
Buildings and structures of the Catholic Church